Robert Stricker (16 August 1879 – 1944) was a Jewish Austrian politician.

Born in Brno (present-day Czech Republic), Stricker graduated from high school at the technical college. He entered the service of the Imperial Royal Austrian State Railways, where he was active in management.

He was elected at the 1919 Austrian Constitutional Assembly election as the only representative of the Jewish National Party, founded in 1907 under the Austro-Hungarian Empire, which never again succeeded in sending a representative to the Austrian Parliament.

In addition, Stricker was a Zionist activist, and for many years was a board member of the Israelitische Kultusgemeinde Wien. He was the publisher of the Jewish weekly magazine Die Neue Welt, established in 1926 as a replacement for the defunct Zionist journal Die Welt.

After the Anschluss, Robert Stricker was sent to Dachau, but was eventually released. In 1942 he was sent to Theresienstadt, and is reported to have been killed in 1944 in Auschwitz. Contrary to a New York Times 1978 report, a US POW (Lt Robert L. Stricker) murdered in Austria in 1945 was not Jewish and was not a son of Dr. Robert Stricker.

Notes and sources

Bibliography
Stricker, Robert, Jüdische Politik in Oesterreich : Tätigkeitsbericht und Auszüge aus den im österreichischen Parlamente 1919 und 1920 gehaltenen Reden / Robert Stricker, Wien : Wiener Morgen-Zeitung, [1920?], 39 p. (on microfilm at the Library of Congress)
Fraenkel, Josef (ed.), Robert Stricker, London, 1950, 94 p., LCCN 54031133

1879 births
1944 deaths
Musicians from Brno
People from the Margraviate of Moravia
Czech Jews
Jewish Austrian politicians
Jewish National Party politicians
Members of the Constituent National Assembly (Austria)
Dachau concentration camp survivors
Theresienstadt Ghetto prisoners
Austrian people who died in Auschwitz concentration camp
Politicians who died in Nazi concentration camps
Austrian civilians killed in World War II
Czech people who died in Auschwitz concentration camp
Czech Jews who died in the Holocaust
Austrian Jews who died in the Holocaust